The 2012–13 season was Colchester United's 71st season in their history and fifth successive season in the third tier of English football, League One. Alongside competing in the League One, the club also participated in the FA Cup, the League Cup and the Football League Trophy.

The 2012–13 season marked the club's 75th anniversary, but the club's on-field performance was poor, suffering 23 league defeats while achieving a club-record nine consecutive defeats. John Ward was relieved of his duties with the club in the relegation zone but his replacement, former U's defender Joe Dunne, turned around United's fortunes, leading them to mid-table by November. However, the club then embarked on their record run of nine successive defeats, which spanned from mid-November to mid-January. At the end of this run, the club dropped into the relegation zone, before escaping and then returning to the drop zone in early February. They flirted with relegation for the remainder of the season until they secured safety on the final day of the season with a 2–0 win at Carlisle United, finishing in 20th place.

Colchester exited each cup competition after just one game, suffering defeats at Yeovil Town and Northampton Town in the League Cup and League Trophy respectively, while they were humiliated in the FA Cup first round by non-League Essex rivals Chelmsford City by a 3–1 margin.

Season overview
For the 2012–13 season, the U's marked their 75th anniversary with a special home kit which was designed with the usual blue and white stripes, but did not have a main sponsorship logo. The club hoped to promote local businesses on a game-by-game basis in order to reflect on the club's early days without a sponsor.

In pre-season, Colchester started with a comfortable 6–0 win over Heybridge Swifts. Ian Henderson and Freddie Sears both scored a brace in a one-sided first half. Academy product Tosin Olufemi also scored twice in the second half to secure a convincing win for the U's. The club then embarked on a pre-season training camp in the Netherlands. Colchester took on a youthful Vitesse side and won 3–2, with goals from Freddie Ladapo, Marcus Bean and Freddie Sears. The game also saw the return of Magnus Okuonghae who had re-signed for the club after briefly leaving the club following the expiry of his contract.

A crowd just shy of 8,000 at the Colchester Community Stadium saw recently promoted Premier League side West Ham United beat Colchester 2–1 with Anthony Wordsworth scoring the goal for the home side. An experimental U's side then lost 4–1 at Witham Town, with then-triallist Jackson Ramm scoring Colchester's consolation goal. They responded by beating Maldon & Tiptree 2–1 courtesy of Freddie Sears fourth goal of pre-season and another from Drey Wright. The following day, Colchester won 2–1 at Brentwood Town with goals from John-Joe O'Toole and Freddie Ladapo.

Colchester hosted Championship side Derby County on 3 August. Freddie Sears scored a brace, but drew 2–2 after an unfortunate Magnus Okuonghae own goal and Theo Robinson's equaliser came as the final kick of the game. They then hosted Ipswich Town, who won 2–1 after two first-half goals from Michael Chopra, but Clinton Morrison's first goal for the club reduced the deficit in the second-half. Colchester then rounded off their pre-season with a 1–0 win at Conference North side Bishop's Stortford with Drey Wright's solo-effort the difference between the two sides.

August
Colchester's season started in the League Cup first round at Yeovil Town, where Academy product Drey Wright started to make his professional debut. Also making his club debut was forward Clinton Morrison. The U's were soundly beaten 3–0 on the night.

Colchester's league campaign kicked off on 18 August with a 0–0 draw at Preston North End, with Mark Cousins producing a string of saves in the U's goal to preserve an opening day point. Colchester then held Portsmouth to a 2–2 draw at the Community Stadium, with a first U's goal for Michael Rose and Magnus Okuonghae scoring the other. Jordan Obita struck late on to earn a point for the away team.

Former Sheffield Wednesday striker Clinton Morrison scored an equaliser, his first goal for the club, in a 1–1 draw against Sheffield United with what was the U's first shot on target, in the 73rd-minute, to secure a third successive draw for Colchester.

September
Colchester slumped to their first league defeat of the season on 1 September after they were beaten 4–0 at Tranmere Rovers following a Jake Cassidy hat-trick. A 1–0 defeat at Brentford consigned the U's to their worst league start since 1996, conceding an 88th-minute goal.

On 15 September, Colchester found themselves bottom of the League One table after six games and no wins following a 2–1 home defeat by Doncaster Rovers. Their stay at the bottom of the league was brief however, when Anthony Wordsworth's late penalty kick earned them a point during their 1–1 home draw with Crawley Town.

On 22 September, the U's cemented their worst-ever start to a league season with a 1–0 defeat at Scunthorpe United. This result proved the final straw for chairman Robbie Cowling as John Ward was sacked as Colchester manager, leaving the club after two years in charge with the U's without a win in League One and 22nd in the table. Assistant manager Joe Dunne was appointed caretaker manager.

On 27 September, Dunne was appointed full-time manager of Colchester United. He assigned Mark Kinsella as his assistant. Two days later, Dunne took charge of his first match and promptly led the team to their first win of the campaign, a 3–1 home victory over Hartlepool United with two debut goals for loan-signing Jabo Ibehre and an earlier equalising goal from Gavin Massey.

October
On 2 October, Colchester earned their first away win of the season at Swindon Town. They won 1–0 courtesy of a Michael Rose free kick against his former club. Colchester were again defeated by Yeovil on 6 October, on this occasion 3–1, with Jabo Ibehre scoring Colchester's only goal. This was Dunne's first defeat as Colchester manager.

Having received a bye in the first round of the Football League Trophy, the U's faced former manager Aidy Boothroyd's Northampton Town in the second round of the competition on  9 October. With the U's leading 1–0 at half-time through a Freddie Sears goal, young debutant Alex Gilbey gave away a penalty from which Northampton scored, before conceding a second goal two minutes later to hand the Cobblers a 2–1 victory.

Loanee Sanchez Watt ended Stevenage's unbeaten start to the season on 13 October with his first goal of the season in a 1–0 home victory for Colchester. Colchester then made it four league wins in five games under Joe Dunne on 20 October with a 2–0 home victory over Carlisle United. Loanees Craig Eastmond and Jabo Ibehre scored the goals. The U's then secured their fifth win in six league games on 23 October with a 2–0 win at Leyton Orient, with goals from Anthony Wordsworth and Ian Henderson.

On 27 October, Colchester allowed a 2–0 lead to slip to draw 2–2 away at Shrewsbury Town with both goals coming from Arsenal loanees Eastmond and Watt.

November
Colchester started the month with an FA Cup tie at Essex neighbours Chelmsford City in the first round. It was the first competitive encounter between the sides for 44 years, the last being an FA Cup second round tie in January 1968. Chelmsford won on this occasion, knocking out their Football League opponents 3–1. Donovan Simmonds scored twice, before Michael Rose's free kick reduced the deficit, but Jamie Slabber's effort late on sealed the win for the Conference South side.

On 6 November, Colchester were defeated 2–0 at home by Notts County. The U's then suffered their third defeat in as many games with a 3–2 defeat at Crewe Alexandra, having led 2–0 at half-time following goals from Freddie Sears and Ian Henderson. The team responded to this defeat with a 2–0 victory over Bury, Wordsworth and Sears scoring the goals in the second-half. The U's then lost 3–1 at home to Coventry City on 20 November, with Tom Eastman registering the only goal for the home side. Colchester were beaten 5–1 by Milton Keynes Dons on 24 November. Ian Henderson scored Colchester's consolation and later Gavin Massey was sent off for a tackle on Adam Chicksen.

December
Owing to an early FA Cup exit, Colchester had a two-week break heading into their 8 December home league match against Oldham Athletic. However, the U's fell to their fifth defeat in six games as the visitors prospered 2–0, with Brian Wilson scoring an unfortunate own goal. Colchester continued their losing streak when a 1–0 defeat at AFC Bournemouth left them just two points above the relegation zone. They followed this up with a fifth consecutive away league defeat on 22 December with another 1–0 defeat, this time at Walsall, earning the hosts their first victory in 17 games. A further defeat followed at home to high-flying Brentford on Boxing Day, but despite the reverse, a youthful U's side put in a promising display and featured a first professional goal from Drey Wright on his first league start for the club.

January
Colchester's New Year's Day game was a trip to Crawley, where they continued their losing run with a miserable 3–0 defeat, Crawley's first home win in nine weeks. On 5 January, Colchester equalled their longest-ever losing run with a 1–0 defeat at Doncaster in a game in which Josh Thompson had a goal ruled out for an infringement by another player.

On 12 January, Colchester set the unwanted club record of nine consecutive defeats as fellow strugglers Scunthorpe United won 2–1at the Community Stadium. The result left the U's in the relegation zone and manager Joe Dunne considering his position.

Colchester's trip to Hartlepool on 19 January was postponed due to heavy snow, with their next fixture on 26 January at home to Walsall. Colchester ended their losing streak with a solid 2–0 victory, with goals from Jabo Ibehre, making his second debut for the club, and Freddie Sears. Before January was out, the club sold youth-team product Anthony Wordsworth to neighbours Ipswich Town for a £100,000 transfer fee, potentially rising to £200,000.

February
The U's began February with a 3–2 win against Portsmouth with a brace from Gavin Massey and a Freddie Sears penalty earning Colchester a first away victory since October. They then slipped to within two points of the relegation zone after a 1–0 home defeat by Swindon Town on 5 February.

Colchester made it three wins in four games with victory over Preston on 9 February as Freddie Sears scored the only goal of the game. A heavy 3–0 defeat by Sheffield United on 16 February left the U's in 20th position, one spot outside of the relegation zone. They were then soundly beaten 5–1 at home by Tranmere Rovers as Colchester dropped into the relegation places. Magnus Okuonghae scored the consolation for Colchester as the U's found themselves three points adrift from safety albeit with a game in hand over 20th-placed Scunthorpe. A win against high-fliers Yeovil on 26 February rounded out the month as the U's made amends for League Cup and earlier league defeats against the Glovers. Billy Clifford scored his first professional goal and Freddie Sears added a second in the 2–0 victory.

March
On 2 March, Colchester won 2–0 at Stevenage with both goals coming from Jabo Ibehre. The result lifted the U's out of the relegation places. Ten-man Colchester then battled to a 0–0 draw at relegation-threatened rivals Hartlepool after Jabo Ibehre was sent off. A 2–1 defeat followed at Crewe on 9 March, George Porter scoring the leveller before Mathias Pogba's winner. The U's let a two-goal lead slip to draw 2–2 at Coventry on 12 March having taken the lead through Gavin Massey and loanee Michael Smith doubling the lead after half-time. An injury time equaliser denied the U's all three points.

Colchester began their game at Bury with George Porter dismissed for violent conduct after only four minutes. They then fell behind after a goal from former United player Craig Fagan. However, Colchester levelled first through Josh Thompson, and the took the lead a minute later through Clinton Morrison. The win moved the U's seven points clear of the relegation zone. On Good Friday, Colchester lost 1–0 to Bournemouth at the Community Stadium, once again leaving the club within three points of the relegation positions with six games to play.

April
A relegation battle with Oldham Athletic ended 1–1 on 1 April, with Drey Wright scoring Colchester's goal before an Oldham equaliser mid-way through the second-half. An important win over Leyton Orient on 6 April followed, moving Colchester six points above the relegation zone as rivals Oldham and Scunthorpe failed to win. Goals came courtesy of Gavin Massey and Drey Wright. Former U's player Kevin Lisbie scored Orient's goal and had a penalty saved by Sam Walker with twelve minutes remaining.

Jabo Ibehre scored Colchester's goal in a 3–1 defeat at Notts County on 13 April, and then a second successive defeat at home by Milton Keynes Dons threatened to reduced the points advantage over Scunthorpe in their relegation scrap, but with Scunthorpe losing to already-relegated Bury, the U's maintained a five-point advantage and thus requiring a win from their next two games to guarantee safety. A lacklustre 0–0 draw with Shrewsbury in the final home game of the season, coupled with a win for Scunthorpe over MK Dons meant the relegation battle moved on to the final day of the season with each team separated by three points. Anything but a win for Scunthorpe against Swindon would mean relegation, while Colchester required at least a draw for survival.

With the future of the club to be decided on the final day of the season, it was imperative that Colchester earned at least a point from their away game at Carlisle on 27 April to guarantee League One football for another season. Goals from Gavin Massey and Tom Eastman ensured this in a 2–0 victory, while Scunthorpe were relegated despite winning at Swindon.

Players

Transfers

In

 Total spending:  ~ £0

Out

 Total incoming:  ~ £100,000

Loans in

Loans out

Match details

Friendlies

League One

League table

Results round by round

Matches

Football League Cup

Football League Trophy

FA Cup

Squad statistics

Appearances and goals

|-
!colspan="16"|Players who appeared for Colchester who left during the season

|}

Goalscorers

Disciplinary record

Captains
Number of games played as team captain.

Clean sheets
Number of games goalkeepers kept a clean sheet.

Player debuts
Players making their first-team Colchester United debut in a fully competitive match.

Honours and awards
Players to receive awards at the club's End of Season Awards Dinner held on 30 April 2013.

See also
List of Colchester United F.C. seasons

References

General

Specific

2012-13
2012–13 Football League One by team